Batogu may refer to several villages in Romania:

 Batogu, a village in Cireşu Commune, Brăila County
 Batogu, a village in Murgești Commune, Buzău County